Quickborn is a rich town in the district of Pinneberg, in Schleswig-Holstein, Germany. It belongs to Metropolregion Hamburg  and is located on the north part of Hamburg on Autobahn A7.

Geography
Quickborn is located about 18 km north from the centre of Hamburg, on the eastern edge of Kreis Pinneberg. It lies on the A7 between Hamburg and Neumünster. It is situated just 6 km from the Hamburg Airport. Quickborn is also located along the Hamburg-Altona–Neumünster railway, which connects it to the AKN railway and buses of the Hamburger Verkehrsverbund. Northwest of Quickborn is the Himmelmoor, the largest raised bog in Schleswig-Holstein, which is about 605 hectares large. It has long been used for  peat mining. For this purpose, a narrow-gauge railway was built through the bog. South of the city is the Holmmoor, a nature preserve that is about 110 ha. large.

International relations

Quickborn is twinned with:
 Boxholm,  Sweden (since 13.09.1974)
 Uckfield,   Sussex, England (since 18.02.1990)
 Malchow,  Germany (since 08.09.1990)

Notable people
 Franz Josef Degenhardt (1931–2011), songwriter, poet, satirist, novelist 
 Mike Krüger (born 1951), Comedian, actor, singer, lived for several years in Quickborn
 Daniel Matthias Heinrich Mohr (1780–1808), botanist
 Carlo von Tiedemann (born 1943), TV Anchorman and actor

References 

Towns in Schleswig-Holstein
Pinneberg (district)